Danielle Nicole Panabaker (born September 19, 1987) is an American actress. She began acting as a teenager and came to prominence for her roles in the Disney films Stuck in the Suburbs (2004), Sky High (2005) and Read It and Weep (2006), and in the HBO miniseries Empire Falls (2005). She won three Young Artist Awards: for guest-starring in an episode of the legal drama television series The Guardian (2004), for her lead role in the TV film Searching for David's Heart (2005) and for her ensemble performance in the family comedy film Yours, Mine & Ours (2005).

Panabaker came to wider attention as a cast member in the CBS legal drama series Shark (2006–2008) and is also noted as a scream queen, having starred in the psychological thriller Mr. Brooks (2007) and the horror films Friday the 13th (2009), The Crazies (2010), John Carpenter's The Ward (2010) and Piranha 3DD (2012).

After starring in recurring roles on Necessary Roughness (2011–2013), Bones (2012–2013) and Justified (2014), Panabaker guest-starred as Caitlin Snow on The CW television series Arrow in April 2014. The character was then spun off into the main cast of The Flash which premiered that October. Starting with the series' second season, Panabaker began playing the character's alter ego Killer Frost in different capacities, in conjunction with her role as Snow, leading to subsequent guest appearances on Arrow, Supergirl and Legends of Tomorrow. For her role on The Flash as Frost, Panabaker has been nominated for five Teen Choice Awards and won the 2021 Saturn Award for Best Supporting Actress on Television.

Early life
Panabaker was born in Augusta, Georgia, to Donna (née Mayock) and Harold Panabaker. Her younger sister, Kay Panabaker, was also an actress and is currently working as a zoologist. As her father's sales job took them across the country, the family spent time in South Carolina, Pennsylvania, and, for a short time around Panabaker's kindergarten year, in Orange, Texas. She took a theater class at a summer camp, discovered her love of acting, and started acting in community theaters at the age of 12, later auditioning for commercials.

After moving to Naperville, Illinois, in 2000, Panabaker went to Crone Middle School and then Neuqua Valley High School, participating in the speech team. She graduated from high school when she was 14 years old. Panabaker also took ballet and pointe classes up until she was fifteen. In 2003, feeling it was the only way to land acting roles regularly, Panabaker, her sister, and their mother relocated to Los Angeles, California, so she could pursue an acting career. She attended Glendale Community College, studying acting. In 2005, she earned her associate degree and appeared on the national Dean's List. In 2006, she began her senior year at the University of California, Los Angeles, from which she graduated with a Bachelor of Arts in June 2007, again appearing on the Dean's List.

Career

Panabaker followed her initial appearances in commercials with roles in television, including a part in The Guardian (for which she won a Young Artist Award), as well as other television series including Malcolm in the Middle, Law & Order: Special Victims Unit, Medium, and Summerland, and the Disney Channel Original Movie Stuck in the Suburbs. She also appeared in the Lifetime Television productions Sex and the Single Mom and Mom at Sixteen, as well as the well-reviewed miniseries Empire Falls. She considers Empire Falls to be her big break, as it gave her the confidence to pursue her career. In addition, Panabaker appeared in stage productions with roles in musical theater, including West Side Story, Pippin, Once upon a Time, and Beauty Lou and the Country Beast. In 2004, she starred in the ABC film "Searching for David's Heart". In 2005, Panabaker co-starred in two widely released theatrical films, Sky High and Yours, Mine & Ours. Her next role was in the film Home of the Giants (2008). She also had a supporting role in the film Mr. Brooks. In the Disney Channel original movie Read It and Weep, she plays Is, an alternate version of Jamie, who was played by her real-life sister, Kay Panabaker.

From 2006 to 2008, Panabaker starred in the CBS television drama Shark, playing Julie Stark, the daughter of the lead character. In 2009, Panabaker played Jenna, a main character in the Friday the 13th remake. Panabaker next starred in the films The Crazies and The Ward.

In 2011, Panabaker starred as Katie Lapp, the lead character in the Hallmark Channel movie The Shunning, based on the novel by Beverly Lewis. She was to reprise her role in the 2013 sequel The Confession, but a scheduling conflict forced her to drop out, and the role was recast. In 2013, she starred in another Hallmark Channel movie, Nearlyweds. On May 5, 2013, Panabaker joined actors including Philip Baker Hall, Bill Pullman, and Maggie Siff in performing at Cedering Fox's WordTheatre, where they read aloud contemporary short fiction. In 2014, Panabaker starred in Bradley D. King's award-winning science-fiction film Time Lapse, for which she won the award for Best Actor/Actress at the 2014 London Independent Film Festival.

In April 2014, Panabaker guest starred as Caitlin Snow in a second-season episode of the CW series Arrow; since October 2014, she has starred as the same character in the spinoff series The Flash. Panabaker made her directorial debut with the eighteenth episode of the series' fifth season, entitled "Godspeed".

Charity work
Panabaker volunteers for multiple organizations including the Art of Elysium, Unicef, and Young Storytellers Foundation. In May and June 2019, Panabaker, DC Comics co-publisher Jim Lee, writer Tom King, and fellow CW series actresses Nafessa Williams and Candice Patton toured five U.S. military bases in Kuwait with the United Service Organizations (USO), where they visited the approximately 12,000 U.S. military personnel stationed in that country as part of DC's 80th anniversary of Batman celebration.

Personal life
In July 2016, Panabaker announced that she was engaged to her longtime boyfriend Hayes Robbins, and they married on June 24, 2017, They have two children, one born in 2020 and another born in 2022.

Filmography

Film

Television

Music videos
 "Misfit" (2003) by Amy Studt, as school girl

Web

Awards and nominations

References

External links

 
 
 

1987 births
21st-century American actresses
Actresses from Augusta, Georgia
Actresses from Georgia (U.S. state)
American child actresses
American film actresses
American musical theatre actresses
American television actresses
Glendale Community College (California) alumni
Living people
University of California, Los Angeles alumni